William Coulthard (fl. 1932–1937) was an English footballer who made 119 appearances in the Football League playing as a full back for Darlington in the 1930s. He was on the books of Southend United and Tottenham Hotspur, but without representing either in the league, and played non-league football for Spennymoor United and South Shields.

References

Year of birth missing
Year of death missing
Footballers from Darlington
English footballers
Association football fullbacks
Southend United F.C. players
Tottenham Hotspur F.C. players
Spennymoor United F.C. players
Darlington F.C. players
South Shields F.C. (1936) players
English Football League players
Place of death missing